Westringia ophioglossa is a species of plant in the mint family that is endemic to Western Australia.

Etymology
The specific epithet ophioglossa (‘snake's tongue’) refers to the appearance of the forked lateral petals of the flowers.

Description
The species grows as a compact, erect shrub to 1.3 m in height. The leaves are 6.5–10 mm long and 0.9–1.3 mm wide, occurring in crowded whorls of four. The flowers are white with purple dots, appearing from late November to December.

Distribution and habitat
The species occurs in the Avon Wheatbelt IBRA bioregion of south-western Australia. It is known only from a single roadside population, near the town of Maya, in open mallee woodland in association with Eucalyptus leptopoda and Grevillea paradoxa.

References

ophioglossa
Lamiales of Australia
Eudicots of Western Australia
Plants described in 2013